Muga is a village development committee in Dhankuta District in the Kosi Zone of eastern Nepal. At the time of the 1991 Nepal census it had a population of 4101 people living in 738 individual households.

References

Populated places in Dhankuta District